Pazhayangadi railway station or Payangadi railway station (Code: PAZ) is a railway station in Kannur District, Kerala in India. 
This Railway station finds place in the list of top 100 Railway stations in Southern Railway, in terms of earnings and number of passengers, 
as per latest statistics.  It is a NSG 5 grade station generating an annual passenger earnings of more than Rs. 6.00 Crores and handling 
more than 10 lakh passengers, according to the  Categorisation of Stations 2017 of Southern Railway.

Location 
Pazhayangadi Railway station is located just 1.2 km from Pazhayangadi Bus Stand.   

Kannur International Airport is 50 km from the railway station which will be the airport station.

Trains stopping at Pazhayangadi 
 Mangala lakshadweep superfast express
 Parasuram express
 Mangalore Kozhikode passenger
 Mangalore Chennai Egmore Link express
 Mangalore Coimbatore fast passenger
 Mangalore Chennai superfast mail
 Mangalore Thiruvananthapuram express
 Mangalore Kannur passenger
 Maveli express
 Byndoor Kannur passenger
 Malabar express

Administration 
It falls under the Palakkad railway division of the Southern Railway zone, Indian Railways.

Railway stations in Kannur district
Railway stations opened in 1904
Palakkad railway division